The Adjutant-General of the Indian Army is the senior administration officer who reports to the Chief of Army Staff and is also the Colonel of the Corps of Military Police and Judge Advocate General.

Role, organisation and function
The office of the Adjutant General deals with a wide spectrum of issues relating to Army, which includes manpower planning, human resource policy, recruitment, discipline,  matters relating to Judge Advocate General's Department, Provost Marshal Directorate (Corps of Military Police), missing defence personnel, service matters relating to personnel and welfare of serving soldiers.

The Adjutant-General's office is organised as follows: 

Director General (Manpower Planning and Personnel Services)
Additional Directorate General Manpower
Additional Directorate General of Recruiting
Additional Directorate General Personnel and Services
Director General (Discipline, Ceremonial and Welfare)
Additional Directorate General (Discipline and Vigilance)
Additional Directorate General (Ceremonial and Welfare)
Provost Marshal
Judge Advocate General's Department 
Managing Director, Ex-Servicemen Contributory Health Scheme (ECHS)
Director General Medical Services
Director General Dental Services
Army Group Insurance
Directorate of Indian Army Veterans, which itself has four sections-
Policy and Outreach
Pension and Entitlements
Benefits and Services 
Career Transition Planning Sections
Army Welfare Education Society
Army Welfare Housing Organisation

Adjutants-General prior to Independence
Adjutants-General before the independence of India have included:

Adjutants-General after Independence
Adjutants-General after independence have included:

References

Lists of Indian military personnel
Indian military appointments
Indian Army appointments